Samuel Werenfels (August 4, 1720 – September 11, 1800) was a famous Swiss Baroque architect.

Biography

Early life
Samuel Werenfels, son of Peter Werenfels (businessman and leather glove manufacturer) and Catharina Socin, was born and grew up in Basel. He was grandnephew and godson of the likewise named Swiss theologian Samuel Werenfels. Werenfels was married to Maria Magdalena Strübin.

Career
As an architect, he was renowned for his Rococo designs, an 18th-century French art and interior design style.

In 1743 he joined the Gesellenbruderschaft der Spinnwetternzunft in Basel and became master craftsman in 1748. In 1788 he became mill inspector and from 1794 master-workman in Basel.  He died in Basel, aged 80.

The buildings erected in Basel and the surrounding area according to Werenfels' plans, testify his stylistic continuousness to the contemporary Alsatian architecture.
Together with Johann Jacob Fechter (1717–1797) and Ulrich Büchel (1753–1792), Werenfels was one of the most distinguished architects and master builders in Basel during the 18th century.

Buildings

Basel 
 Das Blaue und Das Weisse Haus
 Landhaus Ryhiner-Blech (1751)
 Haus Zum Delphin (1760)
 Haus Zum Dolder (1761)
 Posthaus (1773), today this is called the Stadthaus.
 Falkensteinerhof (1779)

Surrounding Area 
 Landhaus Bruckgut in Münchenstein (1758–1761)
 Schloss Ebenrain in Sissach (1776)

France 
 The Parish Church Saint-Rémy (1786) in Hégenheim (Alsace).

References 
 E. Blum and Th. Nüesch, Basel Einst und Jetzt, 1913, Verlag Hermann Krüsi, page 61
 Dorothee Huber, Architekturführer Basel, 2nd edition 1996, Architecture Museum Basel, pages 74 to 75
 Das Bürgerhaus in der Schweiz, Band XXIII - Kanton Basel-Stadt, 3rd part and Kanton Basel-Land, 1931, Orell Füssli Verlag, pages 24 to 26
 Emil Major, Bauten und Bilder aus Basels Kulturgeschichte, 1986, Verlag Peter Heman Basel, pages 136 and 139

Swiss Baroque architects
Rococo architects
 01
1720 births
1800 deaths
Münchenstein
People from Bern
18th-century architects
18th-century Swiss people